The 2nd Indian Infantry Brigade was an infantry brigade formation of the Indian Army during World War II. It was formed in Rawalpindi in September 1939. In October 1940, it was renamed 16th (Independent) Indian Infantry Brigade in November 1941, and left India for Burma. The brigade was caught in the Battle of Sittang Bridge where it suffered heavy losses. Instead of being reformed in September 1942, it was renamed yet again, this time to 116th Indian Infantry Brigade. Attached to the 39th Indian Infantry Division it now provided specialised jungle conversion training. An infantry battalion would spend from four to six months with the brigade, before being sent to the front to replace a tired battalion in one of the fighting divisions.

Formation

2nd Indian Infantry Brigade
1st Battalion, Devonshire Regiment from September 1940
2nd Battalion, 8th Punjab Regiment to March 1940	 
4th Battalion, 12th Frontier Force Regiment to September 1940
1st Battalion, East Yorkshire Regiment March to September 1940
2nd Battalion, 8th Punjab Regiment June to September 1940

16th Indian Infantry Brigade
1st Battalion, 9th Jat Regiment  October 1940 to March 1941
2nd Battalion, 1st Gurkha Rifles October 1940 to April 1941
4th Battalion, 12th Frontier Force Regiment October 1940 to March 1941
4th Battalion, 1st Gurkha Rifles July 1941 to October 1941
1st Battalion, 9th Jat Regiment October 1941 to July 1942
1st Battalion, 7th Gurkha Rifles October 1941 to December 1941
4th Battalion, 12th Frontier Force Regiment October 1941 to January 1942
7th Battalion, Burma Rifles December 1941 to January 1942
4th Battalion, Burma Rifles  January 1942
1st Battalion, 7th Gurkha Rifles  January to February 1942
2nd Battalion, Burma Rifles  February 1942
2nd Battalion, King's Own Yorkshire Light Infantry  February 1942
4th Battalion, 12th Frontier Force Regiment  February to September 1942
4th Battalion, Burma Rifles  February to March 1942 	
3rd Battalion, Burma Rifles  February to March 1942
8th Battalion, Burma Rifles  February to March 1942
2nd Battalion, Duke of Wellington's Regiment  February to May 1942
7th Battalion, 10th Baluch Regiment  February to May 1942
7th Battalion, 9th Jat Regiment  July to September 1942

116th Indian Infantry Brigade
7th Battalion, 9th Jat Regiment September 1942 to September 1943
7th Battalion, 14th Punjab Regiment December 1942 to August 1943
1st Battalion, Assam Regiment March to August 1943
1st Battalion, 8th Gurkha Rifles April to November 1943
2nd Battalion, 7th Rajput Regiment August to December 1943	 
2nd Battalion, 8th Punjab Regiment August 1943 to March 1944	
6th Battalion, 11th Sikh Regiment August to December 1943
2nd Battalion, Ajmer Regiment IAS March to September 1944
5th Battalion, 3rd Madras Regiment March to September 1944
4th Battalion, Jammu and Kashmir Infantry IAS April to September 1944
2nd Battalion, Green Howards May to September 1944
1st Battalion, 3rd Madras Regiment September 1944 to January 1945
6th Battalion, 6th Rajputana Rifles September 1944 to April 1945
6th Battalion, 19th Hyderabad Regiment September 1944 to April 1945
16th Battalion, 6th Rajputana Rifles September 1944 to March 1945
1st Battalion, Cameronians October 1944 to March 1945
1st Battalion, Royal Warwickshire Regiment October 1944 to April 1945
8th Battalion, 6th Rajputana Rifles February to August 1945
1st Battalion, Gloucestershire Regiment April to August 1945
18th King Edward VII's Own Cavalry May to August 1945
1st Battalion, 7th Rajput Regiment June to August 1945

See also

 List of Indian Army Brigades in World War II

References

British Indian Army brigades
Military units and formations in Burma in World War II